Transition scenarios are descriptions of future states which combine a future image with an account of the changes that would need to occur to reach that future. These two elements are often created in a two-step process where the future image is created first (envisioning) followed by an exploration of the alternative pathways available to reach the future goal (backcasting). Both these processes can use participatory techniques (Raskin et al., 2002) where participants of varying backgrounds and interests are provided with an open and supportive group environment to discuss different contributing elements and actions.

Transition scenarios are unique in type not only in terms of how they are created (process) but also their content. Their requirements are guided by transition management concepts and consider the "fundamental and irreversible change in the culture, structure and practices of a system" (Sondeijker, 2009:52,). Transition scenarios are emerging as a scenario type which is more applicable to the context of sustainable development based on their abilities to capture the complexities of system structure and innovation (Loorbach, 2007; Rotmans, 2005,).

Scenario types

There are various types of scenarios that can be used for a range of purposes and are predominantly split between first, second and third generation scenarios.

First generation
First generation scenarios are intended to predict the future as accurately as possible, for instance by extrapolating trends. Examples of these scenarios are weather predictions, forecasts for a wide range of topics such as economic growth, population, building volume etc. They are predominantly based on the quantitative / econometric extrapolation of trends. Another part is based on qualitative "trend watching methods" (e.g. fashion).

Second generation
Second generation scenarios have a more explorative character. Scenarios can be intended to explore possibilities for the future, without pronouncing upon their probability or desirability. Scenarios can then be defined as "a tool for ordering alternative future environments in which one's decision may be played out" (Peter Schwartz, 1991,). These scenarios are based on the presumption that nobody can predict, and therefore should not try to predict the future. "The only relevant discussions about the future are those where we succeed from shifting from the question "whether something will happen" to the question "what will we do IF something happens" (Arie de Geus, 1998,). An example of this type of scenario was developed by Shell (The Shell scenario method).

Third generation
Third generation scenarios focus on long time spans and preferred societal systems which are normative and explorative in nature and reflective of the structural and societal changes required in pursuing sustainability (Sondeijker, 2009; Edquist 2005,). These scenarios are intended to produce a picture of the future we want. The question then is: "what do we actually want the future to look like?", examples of these scenarios are based, amongst others, on the European Awareness method and include the use of energy in urban environments, sustainable production and consumption, and normative "factor 4" studies. These scenarios were devised based on the claim that scenarios active in first and second generation scenario methods cannot live up to the challenge of imagining, contributing and preparing for the dynamic processes of transformative change. Transitions are complex interactions which need system approaches to define paths towards a sustainable future and transition scenarios are set to address these concerns by providing a method to handle these issues.

Content and process

The creation of transition scenarios has two basic objectives. To ensure that the scenario created is relevant to the concepts of transition management to allow the system to be systematically analysed and to contribute to social learning. These objectives are encapsulated in the content and process, respectively, of transition scenario creation.

Content
Transition scenarios are informed by transition management concepts and theories which it uses as a basis for its contents. In particular, transition scenarios consider long time frames and are both normative and explorative in nature. Their contents are predominantly centred on the following elements (Sondeijker 2009; Geels, F. W, 2002, Kemp et al. 1998,):

Multi-level criteria
Multi-level criteria relate to elements of change (weak signals) that can be identified in present structures occurring at different levels of the system. These provide the opportunity to recognise and investigate levers than can be used for long run transitions. Weak signals combined with uncertain developments can produce the appropriate climate for structural change. Anticipation of weak signals is essential if the development of scenarios beyond the scope of current developments is to be reached.

Multi-pattern criteria
Multi-pattern criteria describe the interaction between actors and structure of the system being analysed. This includes action derived from bottom-up initiatives which are built up from actor groups which are involved in niche-based innovation activities which infiltrate and eventually change the dominant regimes. Equally important are actors across and between levels which can support and further accelerate change. This ensures that practices and habits in the system are transformed through the replacement of the old dominant regime with the new desired future state.

Multi-phase criteria
Multi-phase criteria refer to the different timings of the alternating stages involved in transition management: predevelopment phase, take-off phase, acceleration phase and the stabilisation phase. The nature and speeds of these phases inform the character of the transition highlighting the importance of the barriers and drivers identified. In the take-off phase the point of no return is reached followed by the acceleration phase where cultural, structural and practice changes occur most visibly.

Process
Transition scenarios are also process orientated focusing on the ability of different stakeholders and participants to communicate and imagine their desired future within the discussion groups. Through this participatory process participants are encouraged to change mind set and attitude to think from a long-term perspective. Specific focus on various feasible topics will increase participants' knowledge of the topic area and the alternatives available in its context. These lessons may eventually be internalised within participants resulting in a social learning process (Social Learning Group, 2001,).

See also
Fairtrade Town
Global Scenario Group
Great Transition
Oil Depletion Analysis Centre
Scenario analysis
Scenario planning
Stockholm Environment Institute
Sustainable city
Tellus Institute
Transition management (governance)
Transition towns

References

Environmental policy
Environmental social science concepts
Futures studies
Business process management
Strategic management